Rajesh Chandra is a Fijian academic. In February 2005 he was appointed the first Vice-Chancellor of the newly founded University of Fiji. He served as Vice-Chancellor and President of The University of the South Pacific (USP) ending his term in December 2018. 

Chandra was born in Maro in Nadroga Navosa Province.  He completed his Bachelor of Arts degree at The University of the South Pacific with distinction. and holds a PhD in Industrial/Development Geography, which he completed between 1981 and 1985 at the University of British Columbia.  He is the author of more than 45 articles in academic journals and books.  He is also the author or editor of five books, including Industrialization and Development in the Third World and An Atlas of Fiji, which is used as a textbook in all Fijian secondary schools.

USP career 
Chandra served on the staff of the University of the South Pacific (USP), the South Pacific Islands regional university, from 1975 to 2005, before taking up the Vice-Chancellorship of the new University of Fiji.  He was Deputy Vice-Chancellor at the USP for nine years, and also served for three years as Acting Vice-Chancellor, Pro-Vice-Chancellor (Academic), and Director of Planning and Development. From 1987 to 1988, he was Head of the School of Social and Economic Development, and from 1994 to 1996, of the Geography Department. In early June 2013, USP's council cleared Chandra of allegations (based on a petition circulated by a group called USP-devoted IE for Justice) of corruption and abuse of authority.

After retiring from USP in December 2018, Chandra's successor, Professor Pal Ahluwalia, alleged he had found evidence of significant abuse of office during Chandra's tenure. This included the promotion and overpayment of favoured managers and the systematic abuse of allowances and privileges, amounting to millions of dollars.  The matter was investigated by New Zealand accounting firm BDO, which substantiated many of the allegations but the report was suppressed by the USP Council.  The subsequent scandal over poor governance and mismanagement was widely documented in the international media.  The University Council decided to move the headquarters of USP from Fiji to Samoa in protest at the Fiji Government's interference in the management of the regional institution.

International roles 

Chandra served as Chairman of the Executive Committee of the Commonwealth Universities Study Abroad Consortium (CUSAC) from 1999 to 2003.  He has been a visiting professor or research fellow at numerous institutions, including McGill University, the Macmillan Brown Centre for Pacific Studies at Canterbury University, the National Centre for Development Studies of the Australian National University, and the Pacific Islands Development Program, East-West Center, in Honolulu.

Personal life 
Chandra is married with a son and a daughter.

References

Sources 
The University of the South Pacific website

People from Nadroga-Navosa Province
Living people
University of the South Pacific alumni
Fijian Hindus
Year of birth missing (living people)
University of British Columbia alumni
Academic staff of the University of Fiji
Vice-chancellors of the University of the South Pacific
Fijian expatriates in Canada